"Homer Badman" is the ninth episode of the sixth season of the American animated television series The Simpsons. It originally aired on the Fox Network in the United States on November 27, 1994. In the episode, Homer is falsely accused of sexual harassment and must clear his name. Dennis Franz guest stars as himself portraying Homer in a TV movie.

The episode was written by Greg Daniels and directed by Jeffrey Lynch.

Plot
Homer and Marge hire Ashley Grant, a feminist graduate student, to babysit Bart, Lisa and Maggie while they attend a candy convention. Homer outfits Marge with an oversized trench coat, hoping to smuggle out as much candy as possible, including a rare gummy Venus de Milo. When caught stealing the gummy Venus, Homer makes a makeshift bomb with Pop Rocks and soda to blow up the convention center as he and Marge escape.

That night, Homer frantically searches for the lost gummy Venus until Marge reminds him to drive Ashley home. When she exits Homer's car, he sees the gummy Venus stuck to the seat of her pants. As Homer grabs the candy, Ashley turns around to see him drooling at it. Mistaking this for a sexual advance, she runs off screaming as Homer eats the candy.

The next morning, an angry mob of college students marches onto the Simpsons' lawn and claims that Homer sexually harassed Ashley. They refuse to believe Homer's explanation and stalk him. The tabloid news show Rock Bottom airs an interview with Homer that is selectively (and poorly) edited and presented out of context to make him look like a pervert. The resulting media circus monitors the Simpsons' home and movements around the clock. Homer's reputation is tarnished further after Dennis Franz portrays him as an unrepentant sexual predator in a made-for-television film.

Lisa and Marge suggest that Homer videotape his side of the story for a public-access cable TV channel, but since it airs during a graveyard timeslot, few viewers see it and it only succeeds in angering an old-time bicyclist. Groundskeeper Willie, who enjoys shooting and watching amateur videos, views Homer's tape. He shows the Simpsons his videotape of what really happened the night Homer drove Ashley home. After watching it, Ashley and the media apologize for labeling Homer a monster. Homer promises the television to “never fight again” and goes on to lambast Willie, whose videotaping exploits make him the target of the next media frenzy.

Production
Greg Daniels, the writer of the episode, originally pitched this episode as being more centered on Lisa's and Homer's opposing ideas on feminism. Eventually, the episode became more of a satire of tabloid media, such as Hard Copy. David Mirkin, the show runner at the time, felt very strongly about the "tabloidization of the media" and has said that the episode was as current in 2005 as it was at the time and things have since gotten worse. Several gags in the episode are based on what real life shows like Hard Copy would do, such as making people look to be guilty without a trial as well as creating a complete invasion of privacy by setting up camp outside people's homes. The talk show "Ben", which is hosted by a bear named "Gentle Ben" wearing a microphone on its head, reflects the writers' feeling that anyone could host a talk show because all they need is a microphone and an audience.

Dennis Franz was the writers' second choice for the actor who plays Homer in the television dramatization. According to the DVD commentary, the original actor was more "barrel-chested".

Cultural references
During the convention, a voice over an intercom says the front desk is “Looking for Mr. Goodbar”. The action sequence at the candy convention is "based on every Bruce Willis movie ever made". Bart asks Homer if "the dog in the Coppertone commercial" was sexual harassment. Homer's imagination of living underwater is a parody of the song "Under the Sea" from the Disney film The Little Mermaid. The episode also includes parodies of Hard Copy, Sally Jessy Raphael, the Late Show with David Letterman, and media coverage of the O. J. Simpson standoff. At the conclusion of the episode, the announcer on Rock Bottom jokingly refers to Groundskeeper Willie as "Rowdy Roddy Peeper," a reference to professional wrestler Rowdy Roddy Piper. Like Groundskeeper Willie, Piper's gimmick was that of a stereotypical Scot.

Reception
In its original broadcast, "Homer Badman" finished 50th in ratings for the week of November 21–27, 1994, with a Nielsen rating of 9.5, equivalent to approximately 9.1 million viewing households. It was the highest-rated show on the Fox network that week, beating Married... with Children.

According to David Mirkin, the episode is very highly ranked among Simpsons fans.

In Entertainment Weeklys top 25 The Simpsons episodes list, compiled in 2003, "Homer Badman" was placed eighteenth.

The Daily Telegraph characterized the episode as one of "The 10 Best Simpsons TV Episodes".

In 2003, during the first meeting between Ricky Gervais, co-creator and star of The Office, and episode writer Greg Daniels, Gervais revealed that this was his favorite episode of The Simpsons. Daniels would go on to adapt The Office for American television.

References

External links

The Simpsons (season 6) episodes
1994 American television episodes
Television episodes about sexual harassment